Cartels, also known as Killing Salazar, is a 2017 action film starring Luke Goss, with Steven Seagal in a minor role, and directed by Keoni Waxman. It had a limited theatrical release on July 7, 2017, and was released on DVD and digital streaming on September 19, 2017.

Cast

Production 
Originally titled Killing Salazar, the film was directed by Keoni Waxman and written by Waxman and Richard Beattie. Luke Goss was chosen to play the protagonist, U.S. Marshal Tom Jensen, whereas Steven Seagal, who had collaborated with Waxman on more than half a dozen projects, was cast in a minor role. Seagal also produced the film alongside Binh Dang. Michael Richard Plowman composed the film's soundtrack.

Reception 

Noel Murray of the Los Angeles Times commented that the film "is passably entertaining", but criticised Seagal's involvement in it – which amounted to "roughly 15 minutes of screen time" – as more distracting than it was value-adding, concluding that "with his thick leather coat, bushy goatee, tinted glasses, and whispery monotone voice, he (Seagal) looks like an ordinary schlub in a Steven Seagal costume." Frank Scheck of The Hollywood Reporter credited Waxman for filming the "action scenes with reasonable proficiency" but ultimately labelled Cartels as a "far cry" from Seagal's best works.

References

External links 
 
 

2017 films
2017 action thriller films
American action thriller films
Films directed by Keoni Waxman
2010s English-language films
2010s American films